Little Hatch (October 25, 1921 – January 14, 2003) was an American electric blues singer, musician, and harmonica player. He variously worked with George Jackson and John Paul Drum.

Biography
Hatch was born Provine Hatch Jr., in Sledge, Mississippi. He learned to play the harmonica from his father. Hearing blues and gospel music, Hatch knew he wanted to make music for a living. When he was 14 years old, his family moved to Helena, Arkansas, and the blues scene there caught his attention.

Hatch joined the Navy in 1943. After his tour of duty, he relocated to Kansas City, Missouri, in 1946. He worked for a cartage company for two years and then founded his own cartage business and married.

In the early 1950s, Hatch began jamming in blues clubs in Kansas City. He closed his business in 1954 and took a job with Hallmark Cards. In 1955, he formed and fronted his own band, playing on the weekends and a few nights a week. This group continued to perform for more than 20 years. By the late 1950s, Hatch's harmonica style became influenced by Chicago blues players such as Little Walter, Snooky Pryor and Junior Wells.

A performance by Hatch was recorded by German exchange students in 1971, and these recordings were released on the album The Little Hatchet Band, but its distribution was limited to Germany and Belgium.

Hatch retired from Hallmark in 1986. His band, Little Hatch and the House Rockers, was hired as the house band of the Grand Emporium Saloon in Kansas City. A cassette tape of his blues performances at the Grand Emporium was released in 1988.

In 1993, the Modern Blues label released Well, All Right!, his first nationally distributed album. In 1997, Chad Kassem opened Blue Heaven Studios and founded the APO label. Kassem had befriended Hatch in the mid-1980s and asked him to be his first signed recording artist. The album Goin' Back was released in 2000, followed by Rock with Me Baby in 2003.

From 1999 to 2001, Hatch occasionally toured other parts of the United States and twice toured Europe. He settled in Kansas City and performed locally, frequently playing at BB's Lawnside Bar-B-Q and other venues.

Hatch died in El Dorado Springs, Missouri, in January 2003.

Discography
The Little Hatchet Band (1971)
Well, All Right! (Modern Blues Recordings, 1993)
Goin' Back (APO, 2000)
Rock with Me Baby (APO, 2003)

References

External links
 Little Hatch - Goin' Back from APO Records

1921 births
2003 deaths
American blues singers
American blues harmonica players
Electric blues musicians
Blues musicians from Mississippi
People from Sledge, Mississippi
Deaths from cancer in Missouri
20th-century American singers
20th-century American male singers
United States Navy personnel of World War II